Troyan is a surname. Notable people with this surname include:

Sergei Troyan (born 1984), Russian footballer
Sue Troyan, American basketball coach
Vadym Troyan (born 1979), Ukrainian politician

See also
Troian (disambiguation)
Trayan
Trojan
Trajan